Sin Chew Jit Poh was a Singapore newspaper. It was founded by Aw Boon Haw in Singapore. In the 1960s, it started its Malaysian bureau in Petaling Jaya, with full function printing house. Malaysian edition started to become a separate sister newspaper since they have the full function from news report writing to printing. Due to the Newspaper and Printing Presses Act enacted in 1974, starting from 1975, the two newspaper in Singapore and Malaysia had a separate ownership, which the Singapore edition was owned by Sin Chew Jit Poh (Singapore) Limited; the Malaysian edition was sold by Sin Poh Amalgamated in 1982.

Singapore's Sin Chew Jit Poh ceased publication in Singapore in March 1983 and subsequently merged with Singapore's Nanyang Siang Pau to become Lianhe Zaobao and Lianhe Wanbao; their parent companies, were merged in 1982 as Singapore News and Publications Limited, a predecessor of Singapore monopoly Singapore Press Holdings.

The Malaysian version of Sin Chew Jit Poh (now Sin Chew Daily), is still in circulation.

Gallery

References

Chinese-language newspapers (Simplified Chinese)
Chinese-language newspapers (Traditional Chinese)
Defunct newspapers published in Singapore
Singapore Press Holdings
Aw family
1929 establishments in Singapore
1983 disestablishments in Singapore
Publications established in 1929
Publications disestablished in 1983

zh:星洲日報